Travelling Actors is a 1940 Japanese comedy film written and directed by Mikio Naruse. It is based on a short story by Mushū Ui.

Plot
A kabuki theatre troupe from Tokyo, led by the "famous" Kikugoro, arrives at a rural village for a series of performances. Jin, the town's barber, who was talked into co-sponsoring the event, realises that the "star" is only an actor who uses the famous family name as a publicity stunt. While drunk and angrily searching for his business partner Wakasaya, Jin accidentally destroys the head of the horse costume of actors Hyoroku and Senpei. When Hyoroku rejects to perform in the sloppily repaired costume, Kikugoro decides to use a real horse for the play instead and makes Hyoroku the stable boy. Hyoroku, drunk and enraged about the degradation, puts on the horse costume with Senpei and chases the real horse away.

Cast
 Kamatari Fujiwara as Hyoroku
 Kan Yanagiya as Senpei
 Minoru Takase as Nakamura Kikugoro VI
 Zekō Nakamura as Jin, the barber
 Kō Mihashi as Wakasaya
 Sōji Kiyokawa as Shichiemon Ichikawa

Legacy
In later years, director Mikio Naruse cited Travelling Actors, despite interventions from the censors during production, as one of his personal favourites. Naruse biographer Catherine Russell saw Travelling Actors, alongside Hideko the Bus Conductor and This Happy Life, as part of a series of films with an "interesting twist on national policy principles in that they point to a certain sacred character of everyday life […] and characters gaining some kind of insight in [its] value".

References

External links
 

1940 films
1940 comedy films
Japanese comedy films
Films based on short fiction
Films based on works by Japanese writers
Films directed by Mikio Naruse
1940s Japanese-language films